Stalcup Corner is an unincorporated community in Greene County, Indiana, in the United States.

History
Stalcup Corner was named for the Stalcup family of pioneer settlers.

References

Unincorporated communities in Greene County, Indiana
Unincorporated communities in Indiana